The Toilers is a 1928 American drama film starring Douglas Fairbanks, Jr. and Jobyna Ralston and directed by Reginald Barker. Fairbanks plays one of the toilers (coal miners), while Ralston plays his sweetheart. It is a silent film with synchronized music and special effects.

Cast
Douglas Fairbanks, Jr. as Steve
Jobyna Ralston as Mary
Harvey Clark as Joe
Wade Boteler as Toby
Robert Ryan

Preservation status
Copies of the film are held by several archives ie, George Eastman House, BFI National Film and Television, Library of Congress, New Zealand Film Archive.

References

External links

The Toilers at silentera.com

1928 drama films
1928 films
Silent American drama films
American black-and-white films
Films directed by Reginald Barker
Films about mining
American silent feature films
Tiffany Pictures films
1920s American films